Tapetskolan vid Karlberg ('Karlberg Tapestry School') or Tapetväfveriet vid Karlbergs slott ('Karlberg Tapestry Weaver's Workshop'), also called Karlbergsfabriken ('Karlberg Factory'), was a Swedish orphanage and a school for girls. It was founded by  Ulrika Eleonora of Denmark,  
 Queen  Consort of King Charles XI of Sweden. She founded a large number of charitable institutions which were paid by her personally. The  handicrafts school was situated at the royal summer residence  Karlberg Palace (Karlbergs slott) which King Charles XI had purchased in 1688. 

Tapetskolan vid Karlberg was active from 1688 to 1695. Queen Ulrika Eleonora  died in 1693 and King Charles XI in 1697.
The school of the orphanage was especially known for the tapestry workshop in which the girls manufactured tapestries.   Tapestry artist, Anna Maria Schmilau, 
was the instructor and head mistress of the royal tapestry handicrafts school. Several tapestries of the work of the women at this school are still preserved in the Swedish Royal Collection  (Kungliga Husgerådskammaren) in Stockholm.

References

Other sources
Svenskt konstnärslexikon del V, sid 74, Allhems Förlag: Malmö. 
 Böttiger, John, 1853-1936; Levy-Ullmann, Gaston,  Svenska statens samling af väfda tapeter; historik och beskrifvande förteckning, af dr. John Böttiger,  Stockholm, Fröléen & comp. (C. Suneson), 1895
 Nordisk familjebok / Uggleupplagan. 30. Tromsdalstind - Urakami

Girls' schools in Sweden
Educational institutions established in the 1690s
Schools in Sweden
1690s establishments in Sweden
Defunct schools in Sweden
Orphanages in Europe
17th century in Stockholm